26 Corps, 26th Corps, Twenty Sixth Corps, or XXVI Corps may refer to:

 26th Army Corps (Russian Empire)
 26th Mechanized Corps (Soviet Union)
 26th Tank Corps, Soviet Union
 XXVI Reserve Corps (German Empire), a unit during World War I

See also
 List of military corps by number
 26th Battalion (disambiguation)
 26th Brigade (disambiguation)
 26th Regiment (disambiguation)
 26 Squadron (disambiguation)